Reys may refer to:

People
 Barbara Reys (born 1953), American mathematics educator
 Frank Reys (1931–1984), Australian jockey
 Michael Reys (born 1966), Dutch slalom canoer
 Rita Reys (1924–2013), Dutch jazz singer

Places
 Reys, Iran